Pointe-Fortune is a village municipality in southwestern Quebec, Canada, on the Ottawa River (Rivière des Outaouais) in Vaudreuil-Soulanges Regional County Municipality, northwest of Montreal. The population at the 2021 Census was 582.

History
The area was part of the Seigneury of Rigaud, granted in 1732 to the brothers Pierre and François-Pierre Rigaud de Vaudreuil. Around 1750, they operated a trading post on a point in the Ottawa River, which later became known as Pointe Fortune. The name "Fortune" could refer to Colonel William Fortune who had received a  concession in nearby Chatham Township at the end of the 18th century, or to Joseph Fortune, an early 19th century militiaman and surveyor.

The village was formerly called Petites-Écorces and Petit-Carillon (referring to the larger Carillon directly across the Ottawa River), but in 1851, the post office opened under the English name of Point Fortune (modified to its current name in 1954). In 1880, the Village Municipality of Pointe-Fortune was created out of territory ceded by Sainte-Madeleine-de-Rigaud.

Demographics 

Attractions
Macdonell-Williamson House, which owes its existence to the fur trade and the Voyageurs, is located just west of the historical boundary marker, which still stands and marked the division between Upper and Lower Canada.

The Parish of Saint-François-Xavier-de-Pointe-Fortune celebrated its 100th anniversary in 2004. The village was originally served by the Catholic parish of St. Francois Xavier, established in 1904, which eventually closed on December 24, 2014. The church was sold and is now privately owned.

Local government
List of former mayors:

 John William Crosb (1880–1881, 1882–1883)
 Ernest A. Saint-Denis (1881–1882)
 George Augustus Barclay (1883–1884)
 André Roy (1884–1887)
 William Richard Hunsley (1887–1893)
 Joseph Séguin (1893–1895)
 John Middleton (1895–1899)
 William Brown (1899–1913, 1914–1917)
 Angus Victor Mc Lachlan (1913–1914)
 Eric Galt Brown (1917–1923)
 Joseph Elie Dicaire (1923–1927)
 Joseph Nephtalie Corbeil (1927–1933)
 Joseph Adelard Jean Marie Desjardins (1933–1936)
 Joseph Raoul Lafond (1936–1951, 1961–1964)
 Joseph Héliodore Oscar Labrie (1951–1959)
 Joseph-Paul-Réal Larocque (1959–1961)
 Joseph Wellie Leon Sabourin (1964–1969)
 Joseph Bernard Roméo Séguin (1969–1973)
 Joseph Raoul Juste Gérard Parson (1973–1979)
 Joseph Paul-Emile Roger Pharand (1979–1980)
 Joseph Denis Grégoire Labonté (1980–2001)
 Joseph Roger Gérard Normand Chevrier (2001–2005)
 David Eugene Doughty (2005–2009)
 Jean-Pierre Daoust (2009–2017)
 François Bélanger (2017–present)

Education
Commission Scolaire des Trois-Lacs operates Francophone schools.
 École de l'Épervière in Rigaud

Lester B. Pearson School Board operates Anglophone schools.
 Soulanges Elementary School in Saint-Télesphore or Evergreen Elementary and Forest Hill Elementary (Junior Campus and Senior campus) in Saint-Lazare

See also
 List of village municipalities in Quebec

References

External links

 Official website

Villages in Quebec
Incorporated places in Vaudreuil-Soulanges Regional County Municipality